Events in the year 1933 in Turkey.

Parliament
 4th Parliament of Turkey

Incumbents
President – Kemal Atatürk
Prime Minister – İsmet İnönü

Ruling party and the main opposition
 Ruling party – Republican People's Party (CHP)

Cabinet
7th government of Turkey (up to 27 September)

Events
8 January – First 5-year plan
22 April – Agreement with the creditors of Ottoman Public Debt Administration
1 August – Modern Istanbul University replaced Ottoman Darülfünun
29 October – During the 10th year ceremony of the Turkish Republic, Atatürk gave his Tenth Year Speech

Births
22 January – Sezai Karakoç, poet
31 January, Süleyman Ateş, theologian
5 March – Hayati Hamzaoğlu, actor
1 April – Pars Tuğlacı, linguist, writer
7 April – Sakıp Sabancı, industrialist  
16 April – Erol Günaydın, theatre actor
29 October – Muzaffer İzgü, writer

Deaths
16 January – Bekir Sami Kunduh (born in 1867), diplomat, politician
4 June – Ahmet Haşim (born in 1884), poet

Gallery

References

 
Years of the 20th century in Turkey
Turkey
Turkey
Turkey